Monica Seles and Helena Suková were the defending champions, but none competed this year. Seles was unable to compete after being stabbed in the back in Hamburg only one week earlier.

Jana Novotná and Arantxa Sánchez Vicario won the title by defeating Mary Joe Fernández and Zina Garrison-Jackson 6–4, 6–2 in the final.

Seeds
The first four seeds received a bye to the second round.

Draw

Finals

Top half

Bottom half

References

External links
 Official results archive (ITF)
 Official results archive (WTA)

Italian Open - Womens Doubles, 1993
1993 Italian Open (tennis)